Semolina pudding or semolina porridge is a porridge-type pudding made from semolina, which is cooked with milk, or a mixture of milk and water, or just water. It is often served with sugar, cocoa powder, cinnamon, raisins, fruit, or syrup. A similar consistency to rice pudding can also be made by using more semolina and by baking, rather than boiling.

Semolina pudding has been eaten in Europe since Roman times. The recipe book of Apicius (roughly dated 4th century AD) describes a semolina porridge made from farina mixed with almonds, raisins and raisin wine.

Semolina pudding is also for sale as an instant (powdered) or prepared convenience food. Cream, vanilla, fruit, spices or artificial flavouring is often added. Some of these products must be prepared with milk or water. If only water is necessary, then powdered milk is an ingredient of the convenience food.

Czech Republic, Slovakia, Austria, Germany, Slovenia 

It is served warm, sprinkled with cocoa and sugar, and doused with melted butter. Sometimes other variations and flavours may be used, such as cinnamon, honey, cherry compote, grated chocolate, tuzemák, etc.

Romania 
In Romania it is called . Jam, candied fruit, cinnamon and raisins may be added. Once cooked, the preparation is poured into a cake pan. It is served warm or cold. The word griș may come from German  similar to the English grit.

Hungary 
Hungarians call this dish  or tejbedara, meaning "semolina in milk". Usually cooked with a generous amount of sugar, some butter, and a pinch of salt. It is served warm either plain or sprinkled with cocoa powder, cinnamon sugar, sometimes with fresh or canned fruits, jam, vanilla, choco bits; modern additions include ice cream, whipped cream, brown sugar, maple syrup, candied fruit, granola, pumpkin seeds etc. A similar but much thicker pudding-like product, precooked and packaged as a store-bought convenience food, is marketed under the name grízpuding (mirror translation for semolina pudding).

Lithuania
In Lithuania, this dish is called . Usually, it is cooked in a mixture of water, milk and sugar, and is always served warm, with a topping of cinnamon and sugar, or sometimes jam.

Syria 
This dish is well known in Damascus and Aleppo (as well as other parts of Syria) as Mamonia. It is prepared by adding butter-toasted semolina into boiling water that is mixed with sugar and sometimes cinnamon pieces. It is then served with a variety of toppings including but not limited to white cheese, cinnamon powder and pistachios.

See also

 Cream of Wheat
 List of porridges
 Sago pudding
 Rice pudding
 Tapioca pudding
 Milk kissel

References

Porridges
Puddings
Romanian desserts
Czech cuisine
Slovak cuisine
Hungarian cuisine